In the Eye of the Sun: Mexican Fiestas is a book of photographs by Geoff Winningham. The book is a study of the popular fiestas of Mexico, showing the inhabitants of several Mexican villages. The fiestas intertwine some of the great pagan festivals with Catholic ritual and tradition. These photographs show family scenes, revelers and religious ceremonies.

Subject of the book

About the photographer Geoff Winningham
Geoff Winningham, is best known for his more than fourteen books of photographs and three documentary films relating to North American culture. Geoff has travelled extensively in Mexico, guiding small groups and teaching them photography in Mexico since 1980. After completing an eleven-year study of the popular fiestas of Mexico in 1996 he published the book, In the Eye of the Sun. Since the completion of this project, he has focused primarily on landscape photography. 

Winningham heads the photography program in the Department of Visual Arts at Rice University, where he has taught since 1969. He also teaches children in Houston, Texas and Pozos, Mexico through the non-profit organization co-created with his wife Janice Freeman, The Pozos Art Project.

Images from In the Eye of the Sun 
In the Eye of the Sun: Mexican Fiestas. Geoff Winningham began photographing the popular fiestas of Mexico in 1984

Foreword (an essay): J. M. G. Le Clezio

Three Indian Celebrations 
Written as a complement to Geoff Winningham's collection of photographs In The Eye of The Sun: Mexican Fiestas, Le Clézio's "Three Indian Celebrations" is an essay in three sections which describes his time among the Embera people in the province of Darién, Panama; the Indian mass at San Juan Parangaricutiro, Michoacán, Mexico; and the Corn Mass in Chun Pom, Quintana Roo, Mexico. Le Clézio writes that the Embera are "completely lacking in political organization or religious institutions, the ceremonial function is fulfilled by the 'Beka', a feast of song. This ritual is the most extraordinary moment in the peoples' lives, the moment that affords them the possibility of encountering the invisible forces that surround them and of treating the sick." His account of the Corn Mass briefly describes the history of the people of Quintana Roo and quotes from the last words of Juan de la Cruz Ceh.

In his treatment of these festivals Le Clézio maintains his characteristic style: a sense of respect, admiration, and artistic curiosity for the world of others. He plays, in a sense, the perennial role of an outsider looking into the world of another culture, a man exploring his world through the art of a different humanity. He closes the section on the Embera's ritual singing with the following explanation: "I wanted to describe the singing festival of the Embera Indians because participating in it radically changed my idea of art—the affirmation of another time and another reality that is art. Having once had this experience, I realized I could never again witness an art form more complete and more laden with meaning than this one, whose goal was not only to cure but also to restore lost equilibrium.…I had found the most perfect form, the deepest expression that a human being can give to any quest."

The photographer Winningham chooses Le Clezio to write an essay

Publication history

First English edition

Second English edition

References

1996 books
1996 essays
Books about Mexico
Books of photographs
Essays by J. M. G. Le Clézio
Works by J. M. G. Le Clézio
W. W. Norton & Company books